Martin Procházka (born March 3, 1972, in Slaný, Czechoslovakia) is a retired professional ice hockey player who played for HC Kladno in the Czech Extraliga.  Procházka was drafted 135th overall by the Toronto Maple Leafs in the 1991 NHL Entry Draft and played 32 games in the National Hockey League for the Leafs and Atlanta Thrashers. In his NHL career, he scored two goals and five assists for seven points, collecting eight penalty minutes. He tallied an assist on the first goal in Atlanta Thrashers history, a 4–1 loss to the New Jersey Devils on October. 2, 1999, his only point as a Thrasher. He has also had spells in the Swedish Elitserien for AIK Hockey and the Russian Super League for Avangard Omsk Oblast and Khimik Voskresensk. He won a gold medal with the Czech Republic in the 1998 Winter Olympics in Nagano, Japan.

Procházka also won the World Championships four times with the Czech Republic, in 1996, 1999, 2000 and 2001. He also won the Czech Extraliga with HC Vsetín in 1999.

Career statistics

Regular season and playoffs

International

External links
 

1972 births
Living people
AIK IF players
Atlanta Thrashers players
Avangard Omsk players
Czech ice hockey right wingers
EV Regensburg players
Czech expatriate ice hockey players in Russia
HC Dukla Jihlava players
HC Khimik Voskresensk players
Rytíři Kladno players
HC Vítkovice players
Ice hockey players at the 1998 Winter Olympics
Medalists at the 1998 Winter Olympics
Olympic gold medalists for the Czech Republic
Olympic ice hockey players of the Czech Republic
Olympic medalists in ice hockey
People from Slaný
Toronto Maple Leafs draft picks
Toronto Maple Leafs players
VHK Vsetín players
Sportspeople from the Central Bohemian Region
Czechoslovak ice hockey right wingers
Czech expatriate ice hockey players in Canada
Czech expatriate ice hockey players in the United States
Czech expatriate ice hockey players in Germany